Eric's Club was a music club in Liverpool, England. It opened on 1 October 1976 in the basement of The Fruit Exchange in Victoria Street, with performances by The Runaways and The Sex Pistols (their only Liverpool gig) before soon moving around the block to its long-term site on Mathew Street opposite The Cavern Club where The Beatles and other bands of the 1960s played, and became notable for hosting early performances by many punk and post-punk bands.

The club was started by Roger Eagle and Ken Testi (manager of cult Liverpool band Deaf School) and joined later by Pete Fulwell (owner of a small record label "Inevitable" and later to become manager of Liverpool bands It's Immaterial and The Christians). The club was given the name 'Eric's' by Ken Testi as an antidote to disco clubs with names such as 'Tiffany's' and 'Samantha's'

Music
The club played host to many local, national and international bands primarily within the music sub-cultures of the time, such as Elvis Costello, Buzzcocks, The Clash, Joy Division, Ramones, Sex Pistols, Siouxsie and the Banshees, Cardiacs, The Slits, Talking Heads, The Stranglers, Ultravox, Wire, XTC, X-Ray Spex and early gigs by New Order and Mick Hucknall (pre Simply Red).

The club acted as a catalyst for local musicians (often also from the Runcorn, Southport, Skelmersdale, Wirral areas) and saw many local artists later become successful acts, including Dead or Alive, Echo & the Bunnymen, Julian Cope, The Teardrop Explodes, Orchestral Manoeuvres in the Dark, Ellery Bop and Wah! Heat.

Eric's was a membership only venue whereby members had to buy a yearly membership to enter the club. One of the more beneficial ideas was to provide membership for 'under 18's', which allowed younger music fans to see both local and national bands during a 'matinee' show they would more often than not have had a chance to see. It could be argued that this was merely a marketing ploy or revenue generating exercise, but this encouraged more prominent national bands and artists to visit Liverpool and helped provide a social networking venue for some of the city's future musical artists.

Closing
The club lasted until March 1980 when it was raided by police for alleged drug offences. The final acts that night where The Psychedelic Furs supported by Wah! Heat. Wah! Heat's performance was recorded for a John Peel session, and the poem "The Last Night of Erics (A small opera in the making)" was penned by Rob Jones. Later the club reopened as Bradys, to last some 12 months before closing.

Current status
The original venue building was until mid-2011 (see below) part of the local 'trendy' orientated bar/club culture playing contemporary pop/dance music and is still on Mathew Street, which has an annual festival to promote Liverpool music. The club's main members entrance was situated below (though slightly to the right) of the Beatles Mural sculpture on Mathew Street, which is featured on the wall, opposite the current Cavern club.

In October 2011, a new venue called ‘Erics Live’ was opened by a local Liverpool business person and entertainment consultant Ethan Allen. Although occupying the same location, the new owner and venue have no connection with the original club. The venture, and use of the name and logo, was condemned by a founding owner and many members of the original club, and has since closed. The venue reopened once again shortly after, this time under different ownership, but taking a direction back to the building's original roots of showcasing local live music every night, Eric's can be visited seven nights a week on Mathew Street.

Eric's The Musical
A musical written by Mark Davies Markham (Liverpool born author of West End hit Taboo) and directed by Jamie Lloyd, ran at The Liverpool Everyman Theatre in September 2008.

All the Best Clubs are Downstairs, Everyone Knows That
In April 2009, a book entitled Liverpool Eric's: All the Best Clubs are Downstairs, Everyone Knows That, consisting of extensive interviews and research of the club and its history, was published. The book was researched and written by Paul Whelan and Jaki Florek, and contains many interviews with the people involved in the club and a large amount of previously unpublished material from the time. It is published by Feeedback.

References

External links
Feedback
Eric's Production's Limited

Music venues in Liverpool
Scouse culture of the early 1980s
Nightclubs in Liverpool